Seiry is a village lying within the municipality of Lully, in the  canton of Fribourg, Switzerland. It formerly existed as an autonomous municipality, but on 1 January 2006 was merged with Bollion, into the larger Lully.
Seiry first appears in 1180 AD as Seirie. The Historical Dictionary of Switzerland records a population peak of 209 in 1900, steadily dropping to 89 inhabitants in 1970, before rising again to 200 before the merger with Lully.

References

 

Former municipalities of the canton of Fribourg
Villages in the canton of Fribourg